The 2021 Ohio State Buckeyes football team represented Ohio State University in the 2021 NCAA Division I FBS football season. They were led by third-year head coach Ryan Day, and played their home games at Ohio Stadium in Columbus, Ohio. It was the Buckeyes' 132nd season overall and 109th as a member of the Big Ten Conference.

This was the first time since 2018 that Ohio State did not reach  the College Football Playoff after two losing games against Oregon and Michigan and the first time since 2016 that Ohio State did not reach the Big Ten Championship Game.

The Buckeyes were invited to compete at the Rose Bowl, where they defeated Utah by a score of 48-45.

Previous season

The Buckeyes finished the 2020 season 7–1 overall, and 5–0 in Big Ten play to win the East division. They defeated Northwestern in the Big Ten Championship Game by the score of 22–10. Subsequently, then received an invitation to the College Football Playoff, where they beat the No. 2 Clemson in the Sugar Bowl 49–28, and there they played No. 1 Alabama in the CFP National Championship losing the game 52–24.

Offseason

Players lost 
LB Tuf Borland
LB Baron Browning
P Drue Chrisman
DE Jonathon Cooper
G Wyatt Davis - Declared for NFL Draft
TE Luke Farrell
QB Justin Fields - Declared for NFL Draft
K Blake Haubeil
TE Jake Hausmann
LB Justin Hilliard
C Josh Myers - Declared for NFL Draft
RB Trey Sermon
DT Tommy Togiai - Declared for NFL Draft
CB Shaun Wade
LB Pete Werner

Schedule

Roster

Depth chart
Starters and backups.

Game summaries

at Minnesota

No. 4 Ohio State opened the season at Huntington Bank Stadium, where they faced the Minnesota Golden Gophers. This was the 51st meeting between the teams, with Ohio State having a winning record against the Golden Gophers at 44–7–0. The Buckeyes had won ten straight entering the game, which was their second longest current Big Ten winning streak.  The teams last met in 2018, with the Buckeyes winning 30–14 at Ohio Stadium.

Ohio State took an early lead on 71-yard touchdown run by Miyan Williams and a 35-yard field goal. Leading 10–0, Minnesota scored two consecutive touchdowns in the second quarter to take a 14–10 lead at the half. The teams traded touchdowns to start the third quarter. C. J. Stroud then hit Garrett Wilson on a 56-yard touchdown pass to give the Buckeyes a 24–21 lead. On the ensuing possession, Haskell Garrett recovered a strip sack and returned the fumble 32 yards for a touchdown and pushing the Buckeye lead to 31–21. Following a Minnesota field goal, Stroud hit TreVeyon Henderson on a 70-yard pass and run to extend OSU's lead to 14. Minnesota narrowed the lead to seven again with just over five minutes remaining, but Stroud hit Chris Olave for a 61-yard touchdown, Olave's second in the game and Stroud's fourth touchdown pass. The 45–31 win moved OSU to 1–0 in conference on the season.

Williams ran for 127 yards on nine carries while Stroud completed 13 of 22 pass for 294 yards and four touchdowns. OSU's defense, though scoring a touchdown, surrendered 203 yards rushing and 205 yards passing to Minnesota in the win.

vs No. 12 Oregon

 The No. 12 Oregon Ducks defeated the No. 3 Ohio State Buckeyes 35–28 in a rematch of the 2015 College Football Playoff National Championship. Ohio State, who is now 9–1 in the series, was favored by 14.

This was the first Buckeye game in Ohio Stadium open to the general public since November 23, 2019. Big Noon Kickoff was filmed on location for the game.

vs Tulsa

vs Akron

at Rutgers

vs Maryland

at Indiana

vs No. 20 Penn State

at Nebraska

vs No. 19 Purdue

vs No. 7 Michigan State

at No. 5 Michigan

Awards and honors 

*The NCAA and Ohio State only recognize the AP, AFCA, FWAA, Sporting News and WCFF All-American teams to determine if a player is a Consensus or Unanimous All-American. To be named a Consensus All-American, a player must be named first team in three polls and to be Unanimous, they must be named first team in all five.
See 2021 College Football All-America Team

Player of the Game Awards

Weekly awards

Annual awards

Rankings

Players drafted into the NFL

References

Ohio State
Ohio State Buckeyes football seasons
Rose Bowl champion seasons
Ohio State Buckeyes football